The 2014 Li Na tennis season officially began on 30 December with the start of the 2014 WTA Tour as the defending champion of the 2014 Shenzhen Open. In July, Li ended her nearly 2 year collaboration with coach Carlos Rodríguez. Li announced her retirement from professional tennis on 19 September citing recurring and worsening knee injuries. Li also made the longest winning streak in 2014 WTA Tour with 13.

Yearly summary

Early hard court season and Australian Open

Shenzhen Open

Li Na started her season as the defending champion at the 2014 Shenzhen Open. She defeated former world number two and wildcard Vera Zvonareva and Nadiia Kichenok in the first two rounds, before being challenged by Monica Niculescu in the quarterfinals, winning in three tight sets. She then defeated rising German Annika Beck in the semifinals to reach the final for the second consecutive year, where she defeated compatriot Peng Shuai in straight sets, marking the first successful title defense of her career.

Australian Open
Instead of more preparation in Sydney, Li chose to compete at the Australian Open directly this year, at which she had been a finalist twice in the last three years.  Intent on going one better, Li routed current junior top 2 players Ana Konjuh and Belinda Bencic in the first two rounds. After quickly losing an error strewn first set against Lucie Šafářová, she fended off a match point when trailing 5–6 in the second before rebounding in the tiebreak and decisive set to avoid the upset. She finished the match with 17 winners to 50 unforced errors.  In her fourth round encounter with Ekaterina Makarova, Li delivered the third bagel in the tournament, easing through with a straight set victory. Li followed this up with another dominant performance against first-time Australian Open quarterfinalist Flavia Pennetta to set up a clash with teenager Eugenie Bouchard in the last four. Li easily won the first set having won 20 of the first 23 points to lead 5–0. Down 0–2 in the second set, she reeled off six of the next eight games to close out the Canadian. She reached the final for the third time, where she faced maiden Grand Slam finalist Dominika Cibulková. After winning the first set in a tiebreak, Li stormed through the second set at love to claim her second Grand Slam title, thus becoming the first Asian Australian Open champion and sixth woman to win the title after being match point down.

Her post-match speech became one of the most talked-about moments in the event. Because of her limited English, she jokingly remarked that her agent should "make [her] rich" and her husband is "lucky" to find her before thanking the crowd and everyone involved.

Middle East series

Qatar Open
Since Li missed out on last year edition's of the Qatar Open due to injury, she had no points to defend. She won her second round match against Magdaléna Rybáriková before being upset by qualifier and world No. 134 Petra Cetkovská in three sets, her first loss of the season. However, she reached a new career-high of world No. 2 after the tournament as a result of defending champion and current world No. 2 Victoria Azarenka's withdrawal.

North American hard court season

Indian Wells Masters
After missing Indian Wells in 2013, Li was the first seed this year in the absence of Serena Williams, the first time she was seeded first at a Premier Mandatory event. She enjoyed a first round bye before dispatching compatriot Zheng Jie, Karolína Plíšková and Aleksandra Wozniak in convincing fashion. In the quarterfinals she faced her first top 20 opponent of the season in Dominika Cibulková, a rematch of the Australian Open final. After Li took the opening set comfortably, Cibulková quickly built a 5–1 lead in the second due a plethora of unforced errors off Li's racquet. Li managed to recover three games but was unable to salvage the set. After the pair traded breaks early in the third, Cibulková held double break point with Li serving at 3-all. From there Li won 12 of the next 16 points to clinch the final three games and the victory after 2 hours and 36 minutes of play, maintaining her perfect record against the Slovak. With this win, Li advanced to her first Indian Wells semifinal since 2007. Facing 20th seed Flavia Pennetta in the semifinal, she was defeated in straight sets.

Miami Masters
Li received a bye in the first round of Miami Masters. In the second round she was bound to face Alisa Kleybanova, however the Russian withdrew shortly prior to the match due to a viral illness. In her third round encounter with Madison Keys, she erased two set points in the first set before forcing a tiebreak, which she won. In the second set she won five consecutive games from 0–2 down and eventually took the match handily. She then had an easy win against the 15th seed Carla Suárez Navarro, setting up a quarterfinal with Caroline Wozniacki. After Li burst out to a 4–1 lead in the first set, Wozniacki won four games in a row to go up 5–4, before Li fired back with three games of her own to take the set. The Dane was up 5–3 in the second set before Li reeled off four consecutive games to advance. In the semifinal, she met Dominika Cibulková for the third time this year. Li blew two set points when serving for the first set on her first attempt at 5–3, but successfully closed it out on her second. From 2–all in the second set, Li lost 6 games in a row to lose the set and fall behind 0–2 in the decider, before upping her game to seize six of the last seven games to seal the win, securing a place in her maiden Premier Mandatory final, where she was defeated by world No. 1 Serena Williams in straight sets despite having a set point in the first set.

Clay court season

Stuttgart Open
Li withdrew from this year edition of Stuttgart Open before the tournament.

Madrid Open
Li started her clay season at the Madrid Open, where she lost to Madison Keys in the first round last year. She defeated Kirsten Flipkens and countrywoman Zheng Jie in the first two rounds without much trouble. In the third round match against Sloane Stephens, Li surrendered the first set but regained form to earn a place in the quarter final. She was defeated by eventual champion Maria Sharapova in three sets, after winning the first set comfortably.

Italian Open
At the Italian Open where she was sent home by former world No.1 Jelena Janković last year, Li received a bye for first round and defeated Australian Casey Dellacqua in the second. She then defeated Sam Stosur for the first time after 6 encounters in her career. In the quarterfinals against Sara Errani, Li suffered her first loss to the home favourite.

French Open
The former champion suffered her earliest loss at the event to Kristina Mladenovic.  She was the first Grand Slam champion to lose in the opening round of the following Grand Slam since Petra Kvitová did so at the 2011 US Open.

Grass court season

Wimbledon
The only grass court event Li participated in this year was the Wimbledon Championships. She easily defeated Paula Kania and Yvonne Meusburger in the first two rounds. She then bowed out to Barbora Záhlavová-Strýcová in two tiebreak sets.

US Open Series

Li withdrew from the 2014 Rogers Cup, 2014 Western & Southern Open and 2014 US Open this year due to a knee injury, at all of which she was a defending semifinalist. She surrendered her world No. 2 ranking to Simona Halep following the Rogers Cup.

After skipping the entire US Open Series due to a left knee injury, Li officially announced her retirement from the sport on 19 September 2014, also withdrawing from the tournaments in Wuhan (her hometown) and Beijing. She was ranked no.6 by the Women's Tennis Association at the time of her retirement.

All matches

Singles matches

Tournament Schedule

Singles schedule
Li's 2014 singles tournament schedule is as follows:

Yearly records

Head-to-head matchups
Bold indicates that the player was in the Top 10, italics denotes that the player was in the Top 20 (at the time of the match being played). This list is ordered by number of wins to number of losses in chronological order played.

  Dominika Cibulková 3–0
  Zheng Jie 2–0
  Vera Zvonareva 1–0
  Nadiia Kichenok 1–0
  Monica Niculescu 1–0
  Annika Beck 1–0
  Peng Shuai 1–0
  Ana Konjuh 1–0
  Belinda Bencic 1–0
  Lucie Šafářová 1–0
  Ekaterina Makarova 1–0
  Eugenie Bouchard 1–0
  Magdaléna Rybáriková 1–0
  Karolína Plíšková 1–0
  Aleksandra Wozniak 1–0
  Madison Keys 1–0
  Carla Suárez Navarro 1–0
  Caroline Wozniacki 1–0
  Kirsten Flipkens 1–0
  Sloane Stephens 1–0
  Casey Dellacqua 1–0
  Samantha Stosur 1–0
  Paula Kania 1–0
  Yvonne Meusburger 1–0
  Flavia Pennetta 1–1
  Petra Cetkovská 0–1
  Serena Williams 0–1
  Maria Sharapova 0–1
  Sara Errani 0–1
  Kristina Mladenovic 0–1
  Barbora Záhlavová-Strýcová 0–1

Finals

Singles: 3 (2–1)

Earnings

	
 Figures in United States dollars (USD) unless noted.

See also
2014 Maria Sharapova tennis season
2014 Victoria Azarenka tennis season
2014 Serena Williams tennis season
2014 WTA Tour

References

Li
Li Na tennis seasons
Li Na season